dLocal Limited is a Uruguayan financial technology company. It provides cross-border payments connecting global merchants to emerging markets.

Established in 2016 as a startup, soon it became the first Uruguayan unicorn. The company has offices in Montevideo, São Paulo, San Francisco, London, Tel Aviv and Shenzhen.

As of 3 June 2021, dLocal went public, reaching a stock market valuation of US$9.5 billion. It is listed at Nasdaq, being the second Uruguayan company in history to reach Wall Street after Starmedia in the 1990s.

Their founders, Andrés Bzurovski and Sergio Fogel, are among the 2,000 richest people in the world, according to Forbes.

References

External links
 

Financial technology companies
2016 establishments in Uruguay
Companies established in 2016
Companies listed on the Nasdaq